A museum is an institution that cares for (conserves) a collection of artifacts and other objects of artistic, cultural, historical, or scientific importance and makes them available for public viewing through exhibits that may be permanent or temporary. According to Museums of the World, there are about 55,000 museums in 202 countries. The International Council of Museums comprises 30,000 members in 137 countries.

By country 

Museums in...

 
 Afghanistan
 Albania
 Algeria
 Andorra
 Angola
 Antigua and Barbuda
 Argentina
 Armenia
 Australia
 Austria
 Azerbaijan
 Bahamas
 Bahrain
 Bangladesh
 Barbados
 Belarus
 Belgium
 Belize
 Benin
 Bhutan
 Bolivia
 Bosnia and Herzegovina
 Botswana
 Brazil
 Brunei
 Bulgaria
 Burkina Faso
 Burma
 Burundi
 Cambodia
 Cameroon
 Canada
 Cape Verde
 Central African Republic
 Chad
 Chile
 China
 Colombia
 Comoros
 Costa Rica
 Croatia
 Cuba
 Cyprus
 Czech Republic
 Democratic Republic of the Congo
 Denmark
 Djibouti
 Dominica
 East Timor
 Dominican Republic
 Ecuador
 Egypt
 El Salvador
 Equatorial Guinea
 Eritrea
 Estonia
 Ethiopia
 Federated States of Micronesia
 Fiji
 Finland
 France
 Gabon
 The Gambia
 Georgia
 Germany
 Ghana
 Greece
 Greenland
 Guatemala
 Guinea
 Guinea-Bissau
 Guyana
 Haiti
 Honduras
 Hong Kong
 Hungary
 Iceland
 India
 Indonesia
 Iran
 Iraq
 Ireland
 Israel
 Italy
 Ivory Coast
 Jamaica
 Japan
 Jordan
 Kazakhstan
 Kenya
 Kiribati
 Kuwait
 Kyrgyzstan
 Laos
 Latvia
 Lebanon
 Lesotho
 Liberia
 Libya
 Liechtenstein
 Lithuania
 Luxembourg
 Macau
 Madagascar
 Malawi
 Malaysia
 Maldives
 Mali
 Malta
 Marshall Islands
 Mauritania
 Mauritius
 Mexico
 Moldova
 Monaco
 Mongolia
 Montenegro
 Morocco
 Mozambique
 Namibia
 Nauru
 Nepal
 Netherlands
 New Zealand
 Nicaragua
 Niger
 Nigeria
 Northern Ireland
 North Korea
 North Macedonia
 Norway
 Oman
 Pakistan
 Palau
 Palestinian territories
 Panama
 Papua New Guinea
 Paraguay
 Peru
 Philippines
 Poland
 Portugal
 Qatar
 Republic of the Congo
 Romania
 Russia
 Rwanda
 Saint Kitts and Nevis
 Samoa
 San Marino
 São Tomé and Príncipe
 Saudi Arabia
 Senegal
 Serbia
 Seychelles
 Sierra Leone
 Singapore
 Slovakia
 Slovenia
 Solomon Islands
 Somalia
 South Africa
 South Korea
 South Sudan
 Spain
 Sri Lanka
 Sudan
 Suriname
 Swaziland
 Sweden
 Switzerland
 Syria
 Taiwan
 Tajikistan
 Tanzania
 Thailand
 Timor-Leste
 Togo
 Tonga
 Trinidad and Tobago
 Tunisia
 Turkey
 Turkmenistan
 Tuvalu
 Uganda
 Ukraine
 United Arab Emirates
 United Kingdom
 United States
 Uruguay
 Uzbekistan
 Vanuatu
 Vatican City
 Venezuela
 Vietnam
 Yemen
 Zambia
 Zimbabwe

Other territories 

Museums in...

 Åland Islands
 Cayman Islands
 Falkland Islands
 French Polynesia
 Gibraltar
 Guernsey
 Guam
 Isle of Man
 Jersey
 Northern Cyprus

By topic 

 Aerospace museums
 Archaeological museums
 Art museums
 Automobile museums
 Chemical museums
 Chocolate museums
 Computer museums
 Jail and prison museums
 Islamic art museums
 Music museums
 National museums
 Natural history museums
 Numismatic museums
 Philatelic museums
 Science museums
 Sex museums
 Transport museums
 Video game museums

By size 

 List of largest art museums in the world
 List of most visited art museums
 List of museums with major collections of European prints and drawings

See also 

 Art museum
 Museum
 List of archives
 List of libraries
 List of national museums
 List of buildings and structures
 Lists of tourist attractions

References

External links 
 

Museology